Eric Leonard Talley is the Isidor and Seville Sulzbacher Professor at Columbia Law School and faculty co-director of the Ira M. Millstein Center for Global Markets and Corporate Ownership. He specializes in corporate law, governance, and finance. He also teaches and researches in the areas of mergers and acquisitions, quantitative methods, machine learning, contract and commercial law, alternative investments, game theory, and economic analysis of law. Talley graduated from the University of California, San Diego after studying economics and political science. He earned a doctorate in economics at Stanford University and completed a degree in law at Stanford Law School.

References 

Year of birth missing (living people)
Living people
American legal scholars
Law and economics scholars
21st-century American economists
University of California, San Diego alumni
Columbia Law School faculty
Stanford Law School alumni
Stanford University School of Humanities and Sciences alumni